Amulet Records is a record label based in New Jersey specialising in percussion, avant-garde, and experimental music. The label was established by the percussionist composer and visual artist Billy Martin in 1997, inspired by a percussion session with the Lounge Lizards drummers Grant Calvin Weston and Billy Martin who released their first duet record Percussion Duets in 1997.

Celebrating its tenth anniversary, the catalogue has grown to titles ranging from percussion repertoire produced by Martin; the Mozown series, dedicated to preserving vintage Bob Moses recordings; hip-hop and remix projects; a Sound Healing series and other visionary music and art.

External links
Official site

Experimental music record labels